John Small (born 10 January 1993) is a Gaelic footballer who plays for the Ballymun Kickhams club and at senior level for the Dublin county team. 

He was a member of the Dublin team that won an All-Ireland Under-21 Football Championship in 2014. Small came on as a substitute in the 2015 All-Ireland Final, as Dublin defeated Kerry on a 0-12 to 0-9 scoreline.

References

1993 births
Living people
Ballymun Kickhams Gaelic footballers
DCU Gaelic footballers
Dublin inter-county Gaelic footballers
Gaelic football backs
Sportspeople from Dublin (city)